Coronin, actin binding protein, 2A is a protein that in humans is encoded by the CORO2A gene.

This gene encodes a member of the WD repeat protein family. WD repeats are minimally conserved regions of approximately 40 amino acids typically bracketed by gly-his and trp-asp (GH-WD), which may facilitate formation of heterotrimeric or multiprotein complexes. Members of this family are involved in a variety of cellular processes, including cell cycle progression, signal transduction, apoptosis, and gene regulation. This protein contains 5 WD repeats, and has a structural similarity with actin-binding proteins: the D. discoideum coronin and the human p57 protein, suggesting that this protein may also be an actin-binding protein that regulates cell motility. Alternative splicing of this gene generates 2 transcript variants. [provided by RefSeq, Jul 2008].

References

External links

Further reading